Meyer Löw Schomberg (1690, Vetzburg aka Fetzburg, Württemberg, Germany – 4 March 1761, his house in Fenchurch Street, London) was a German-Jewish physician who moved to London and had a successful business there.

Life
His father, Löw Schomberg, was a physician in Meyer's birthplace and Meyer (probably Löw's eldest son) followed his father's trade, studying classics, then (like his brothers, Salomon, Hertz, and Gerson) medicine, at the University of Giessen.  Completing his MD degree in 1710, Meyer had practises in Schweinsberg, Blankenstein, and then Metz, but then moved to London and settled there in 1721.  His first employment in London was a salary of £30 a year from the wardens of the Great Synagogue to look after the poor.  The Royal College of Physicians admitted him as a licentiate on 19 March 1722 (giving his word and his bond, he was allowed to put off paying the £20 fee for that honour), on 12 January 1726 he became a fellow of the Royal Society, and finally in 1730 he was admitted to the freemasons' lodge of the Premier Grand Lodge of England at the Swan and Rummer, Finch Lane (serving as its grand steward in 1734). 

By 1740 his professional income was said to be 4000 guineas a year, having established a successful practice (Sir William Browne attributed this to his offers of friendship and hospitality to young surgeons).  He was, however, greatly envious of his contemporary, Jacob de Castro Sarmento, making a failed attempt to sabotage Sarmento's election to the Royal Society in 1729 by blackening his name, and in 1738 publicly denounced Sarmento's prescription of an opiate to Benjamin Mendes da Costa, one of Schomberg's former patients, in Janneway's Coffee House.  Sarmento complained of the latter event to the censors of the Royal College of Physicians, but their fine of £4 against Schomberg for breaching their moral statutes only led Meyer embarking on a feud against the College via his son Isaac.  Becoming alienated from London's Jewish community in general and Sarmento and his allies in particular (explained in Schomberg's unpublished 1746 essay, Emunat omen, or ‘A physician's faith’, written in classical Hebrew, and involving his conversion to deism), he also got increasingly entangled in one expensive lawsuit after another.  He also rejected the Jewish community by – after 1742 – encouraging his sons to become Anglican Christians if that would aid them in the liberal professions for which he had had them educated.

On his death, Meyer was buried in Hackney churchyard.

Family
Schomberg had at least seven sons and one daughter: 
Isaac, physician, with Alexander left all but 3s. of their father's estate in his will 
Ralph or Raphael, Isaac's twin, physician and public notary, left 1s. in his father's will 
Joel, physician, practising in Metz and Thann. 
Moses (1720–1779), public notary 
Solomon (1724–1774), public notary, left 1s. in his father's will
Rebecca (1719–1742), died young.
Alexander (1720–1804), Royal Navy captain, with Isaac left all but 3s. of their father's estate in his will
Henry Schomberg, purchased an army commission, reached the rank of lieutenant-colonel, left 1s. in his father's will

References
M. Schomberg, ‘Emunat omen’, trans. H. Levy, Transactions of the Jewish Historical Society of England, 20 (1959–61), 101–11 [Heb. text with Eng. trans.]
E. R. Samuel, ‘Dr Meyer Schomberg's attack on the Jews of London, 1746’, Transactions of the Jewish Historical Society of England, 20 (1959–61), 83–111
E. R. Samuel, ‘Anglo-Jewish notaries and scriveners’, Transactions of the Jewish Historical Society of England, 17 (1951–2), 113–59
William Munk, The Roll of the Royal College of Physicians of London, 2 vols. (1861); 2nd edn, 3 vols. (1878)
Quatuor Coronatorum Antigrapha, 10 (1913), 166
P. Blachais, ‘L'incroyable histoire des Schombourgs, famille juive d'Alsace’, Bulletin du Cercle Généalogique d'Alsace (1988), 540–45
R. D. Barnett, ‘Dr Jacob de Castro Sarmento and Sephardim in medical practice in 18th-century London’, Transactions of the Jewish Historical Society of England, 27 (1978–80), 84–114 · E. Carmoly, Histoires des médecins juifs anciens et modernes (1844)
G. L. Green, Anglo-Jewry and the Royal Navy, 1740–1820: traders and those who served (1989)
C. Roth, The Great Synagogue, London, 1690–1940 (1950)
A. Sakula, ‘The doctors Schomberg and the Royal College of Physicians: an eighteenth-century shemozzle’, Journal of Medical Biography, 2 (1994), 113–19
University of Giessen registers
Society of Genealogists, Colyer Fergusson Genealogical Collection
Annals, Royal College of Physicians, London

External links
http://www.oxforddnb.com/view/article/24826/?back=,24817 Oxford DNB article

18th-century English Jews
18th-century English medical doctors
18th-century German physicians
18th-century Jewish physicians of Germany
1690 births
1761 deaths
German deists
Converts to Anglicanism from Judaism
Fellows of the Royal Society
Freemasons of the Premier Grand Lodge of England
German emigrants to England
English people of German-Jewish descent
German emigrants to the Kingdom of Great Britain